Rainton Gate is a village in County Durham, in England. It is situated between Durham and Houghton-le-Spring, next to West Rainton.

References

Villages in County Durham